DuckTales refers to:

Film and television 
 DuckTales, original TV series
 DuckTales the Movie: Treasure of the Lost Lamp
 DuckTales (2017 TV series), reboot TV series

Video games 
 DuckTales (video game)
 DuckTales 2
 DuckTales: Remastered
 DuckTales: The Quest for Gold